Kimaam is a village in Kimaam district, Merauke Regency in South Papua province, Indonesia. Its population is 746. It is on Yos Sudarso Island.

Climate
Kimaam has a tropical monsoon climate (Am) with moderate to little rainfall from June to October and heavy rainfall from November to May.

References

Villages in South Papua